The Antalya Stadium, officially branded as Corendon Airlines Park for sponsorship reasons, is a multi-purpose stadium in Antalya, Turkey. It is used mostly for football matches, hosting Turkish Süper Lig club Antalyaspor home matches. It has a capacity of nearly 32,537 (all seated) and is totally covered. The stadium has solar panels on its rooftop which generates, on average 7,200 kWh a day, enough to produce its total monthly electricity usage.

Matches

Turkish National Team

Antalya Stadium is one of the main home stadiums of the Turkish national Football team

References 

Football venues in Turkey
Multi-purpose stadiums in Turkey
Sports venues in Antalya
Antalyaspor
Sports venues completed in 2015
2015 establishments in Turkey